Robert Charles Wilson (born December 15, 1953) is an American-Canadian  science fiction author.

Career
Wilson was born in the United States in California, but grew up near Toronto, Ontario.  Apart from another short period in the early 1970s spent in Whittier, California, he has lived most of his life in Canada, and in 2007 he became a Canadian citizen.  He resided for a while in Nanaimo, British Columbia, and briefly in Vancouver.  Currently he lives with his wife Sharry in Concord, a neighbourhood of Vaughan, Ontario located north of Toronto.  He has two sons, Paul and Devon.

His work has won the Hugo Award for Best Novel (for Spin), the John W. Campbell Memorial Award (for the novel The Chronoliths), the Theodore Sturgeon Memorial Award (for the novelette "The Cartesian Theater"), three Prix Aurora Awards (for the novels Blind Lake and Darwinia, and the short work "The Perseids"), and the Philip K. Dick Award (for the novel Mysterium).  Julian Comstock: A Story of 22nd-Century America was a 2010 Hugo Award nominee in the Best Novel category.

In addition to the novels listed below, he is the author of the short-story collection The Perseids and Other Stories, set in Toronto. His first publication appeared in the February 1975 issue of Analog Science Fiction, under the name Bob Chuck Wilson.

Author Stephen King has called Wilson "probably the finest science-fiction author now writing".

Wilson's literary agent is Shawna McCarthy, and his most recent books (including Blind Lake, Spin, and Axis) have been edited by Teresa Nielsen Hayden of Tor Books.

Spin is the first book of a trilogy that continues in Axis and finishes with Vortex. Spin won the Hugo Award for Best Novel in 2006.

His novella Julian: A Christmas Story (2006) was published by PS Publishing in 2007 and was a finalist for the Hugo Award. A novel-length expansion, Julian Comstock: A Story of 22nd-Century America was published by Tor in 2009.

Wilson's latest novel, Last Year, was published December 6, 2016.

Bibliography

Fiction
A Hidden Place (1986)
Nominated for the Philip K. Dick Award for Best novel, 1986
Memory Wire (1987)
Gypsies (1988)
The Divide (1990)
A Bridge of Years (1991)
Nominated for the Philip K. Dick Award for Best novel, 1991.
The Harvest (1992)
Mysterium (1994)
Winner of the Philip K. Dick Award for Best novel, 1994.
Darwinia (1998)
Nominated for the Hugo and Locus SF Awards for Best novel, 1999.
Divided by Infinity (1998)
Bios (1999)
The Chronoliths (2001)
Winner of the Campbell Award, nominated for the Hugo and Locus SF Awards for Best novel, 2001.
Blind Lake (2003)
Nominated for the Hugo Award for Best novel, 2004.
Spin series
Spin (2005)
Winner of the Hugo Award for Best Novel, Nominated for Campbell and Locus SF Awards, 2006.
On 2006-10-12 won the Geffen Award as the Best Translated SF Novel in Israel for 2006
In 2007 won the Kurd-Laßwitz-Preis as the Best Foreign Fiction of the year for 2006, 
In 2009 won the Seiun Award as the Best Foreign Language Novel of the Year in Japan for 2008
Axis (2007)
Nominated for the John W. Campbell Award, 2008.
Vortex (2011)
A Spin and Axis sequel published on July 5, 2011
Julian Comstock: A Story of 22nd-Century America (2009)
Nominated for the Hugo Award for Best novel, 2010.
Burning Paradise (2013) 
The Affinities (2015)
Last Year (2016)

Critical studies, reviews and biography

References

Further reading

External links

 
 

1953 births
Living people
American emigrants to Canada
Canadian science fiction writers
Hugo Award-winning writers
Canadian male novelists